Noel William Atkins (17 October 1925 – 5 December 2015) was a former Australian rules footballer who played for various senior clubs in Tasmania between 1945 and 1959 and also represented the state several times in interstate matches. He was inducted into the Tasmanian Football Hall of Fame in 2005.

Atkins played for Hobart in the Tasmanian Football League (TFL), North Launceston and Launceston in the Northern Tasmanian Football Association (NTFA), and East Devonport in the North West Football Union (NWFU).

References

1925 births
2015 deaths
Tasmanian Football Hall of Fame inductees
Hobart Football Club players
Launceston Football Club players
Launceston Football Club coaches
North Launceston Football Club players
Australian rules footballers from Tasmania